() is Vietnamese marinated charcoal-grilled pork chop.

Preparation 
Flat pieces of pork chops are seasoned with lemongrass and fish sauce, glazed with liquid caramel, and charcoal-grilled.

Serving 
Sườn nướng is often served on top of cooked rice. The dish is called cơm sườn nướng, as cơm refers to "cooked rice" in Vietnamese. It can also be served on top of cơm tấm (broken rice).

See also 
 Galbi – grilled ribs in Korean cuisine
 List of Vietnamese dishes

References 

Vietnamese pork dishes
Barbecue